Old Field Point Light is a lighthouse within the village of Old Field, New York between the entrances to Port Jefferson Harbor and Stony Brook Harbor on the North Shore of Long Island.

Description 
The Old Field Point Light located on the northern tip of Old Field, dates back to 1823. It was built by the United States government for $2,500. The rest of the lighthouse was finished in 1824 for an additional $1,500.

The first light came from nine whale oil lamps and was magnified by a large glass reflector.

In 1868, a new lighthouse was built, with kerosene lamps. In 1933, an automatic revolving light was installed. When the lighthouse was in use, the caretaker used the Old Field village hall as a home.

The U.S. government gave it back to Old Field in 1935, with the proviso that the government can take it back in case of a national emergency. It was taken back during World War II by the U.S. Coast Guard, but after the war they gave it back to the Old Field community. The Old Field light shines on New York's Long Island Sound.

The structure is of the same design as lighthouses at Sheffield Island in Norwalk, Connecticut; Morgan Point in Noank, Connecticut; Great Captain Island in Greenwich, Connecticut, Plum Island on Plum Island in New York; and Block Island North on Block Island in Rhode Island.

Cultural
The Archives Center at the Smithsonian National Museum of American History has a collection (#1055) of souvenir postcards of lighthouses and has digitized 272 of these and made them available online.  These include postcards of Old Field Point Light  with links to customized nautical charts provided by National Oceanographic and Atmospheric Administration.

References

Lighthouses completed in 1868
Lighthouses in Suffolk County, New York
Long Island Sound
1868 establishments in New York (state)